OpenCPN (Open Chart Plotter Navigator) is a free software maritime chart plotter and navigation software for use underway or as a planning tool. Developed by a team of active sailors and tested in real world conditions, it has multiple supported chart formats and a variety of data inputs.

By using satellite navigation and other NMEA 0183 data feeds, OpenCPN determines a ship's own position and status from sensors such as AIS receivers to automatically plot and track the positions of ships in the neighborhood.

In 2017 Norwegian ENC charts were available for OpenCPN.

References

See also 

 OpenSeaMap

Free software projects
Navigational aids
Nautical charts
Electronic navigation